Rangeley Lake, located in Franklin County, Maine in the United States, is fed by several streams.  Its waters flow out from the lake's northwestern corner via the short Rangeley River into Mooselookmeguntic Lake, then Upper and Lower Richardson Lakes, Umbagog Lake and ultimately into the Androscoggin River, Merrymeeting Bay, the lower Kennebec River, the Gulf of Maine and the Atlantic Ocean.

The lake is one of the major headwater lakes of the Androscoggin watershed.

The lake is primarily in the town of Rangeley, while the southern edge of the lake is in unincorporated Rangeley Plantation. The village of Rangeley is located on the northeastern shore of Rangeley Lake, at City Cove, while the village of Oquossoc is at the lake's outlet at its northwest end.

Maneskootuk Island (also called Doctors Island) is in the eastern part of Rangeley Lake.  In the western part there is a small group of islands collectively called South Bog Islands.

Rangeley Lake Seaplane Base
Rangeley Lake has a designated water landing zone for seaplanes (United States Aerodrome M57 – Rangeley Lake Seaplane Base). This aerodrome is one of only a very few aerodromes in the world to be serviced by a GPS instrument approach aligned to a water aerodrome, as well as an NDB approach; almost all other instrument approaches are aligned to runways on land surfaces such as pavement, asphalt, gravel, or turf.

Gallery

References

Lakes of Franklin County, Maine
Lakes of Maine
Northern Forest Canoe Trail